SaGa is a series of science fiction role-playing video games produced by Square, now Square Enix. The series originated on the Game Boy in 1989 as the creation of Akitoshi Kawazu. It has since continued across multiple platforms, from the Super Nintendo Entertainment System to the PlayStation 2, and like the Final Fantasy series, the story in each SaGa game is independent of its counterparts. The music of the SaGa series consists of musical scores and arranged albums from various composers. Some of these composers have created soundtracks and pieces for other Square Enix franchises including the Final Fantasy series and Mana series. The SaGa series is divided up between the original series, released as the Final Fantasy Legend series in North America, the Romancing SaGa series, the SaGa Frontier series, and Unlimited SaGa.

The music of the original series was composed by Nobuo Uematsu, Kenji Ito, Ryuji Sasai, and Chihiro Fujioka. Ito went on to be the composer for the Romancing SaGa series, with each arranged album from the series arranged by a different artist off of Ito's work. Ito composed the soundtrack for the first game of the SaGa Frontier series, but was replaced by Masashi Hamauzu for the second game of the series and Unlimited SaGa. Music from the original soundtracks of the SaGa games has been arranged as sheet music for the piano and published by DOREMI Music Publishing, while tracks from Romancing SaGa Minstrel Song were played at the Press Start -Symphony of Games- 2006 concert and Extra: Hyper Game Music Event 2007 concert in Tokyo and a piece from SaGa Frontier 2 was played at the fifth Symphonic Game Music Concert, held in Leipzig, Germany on August 22, 2007.

SaGa
The original SaGa series consists of Makai Toushi Sa·Ga (lit. "Warrior in the Tower of the Spirit World ~ Sa·Ga"), released for the Game Boy in 1989, Sa·Ga2: Hihō Densetsu ("Sa·Ga2 ~ The Treasure Legend"), and Jikuu no Hasha ~ Sa·Ga 3 [Kanketsu Hen] ("The Ruler of Time and Space ~ Sa·Ga3 [Final Chapter]"), both of which were released for the Game Boy in 1990. The three games were published in North America as The Final Fantasy Legend, Final Fantasy Legend II, and Final Fantasy Legend III. The original releases spawned only one album to date, a combined soundtrack album for all three games. Another album was released in Japan on September 9, 2009, SaGa 2 Hihou Densetsu Goddess of Destiny Original Soundtrack, which is the soundtrack album for the Nintendo DS remake of SaGa 2, SaGa 2 Hihou Densetsu Goddess of Destiny. The soundtrack for the DS remake of SaGa 3, SaGa 3 Jikuu no Hasha Shadow or Light Original Soundtrack, was released on January 12, 2011.

The music of SaGa 1 was composed by Nobuo Uematsu, and that of SaGa 2 by Uematsu and Kenji Ito, while the music of SaGa 3 was composed by Ryuji Sasai and Chihiro Fujioka. Uematsu has stated that while SaGa 1s music could be made of better quality, the emphasis was on enjoying the game, and not solely its appearance or sound. The Game Boy's sound hardware was different from that of the Famicom, which Uematsu was used to composing for at the time, with new stereo and waveforms and only three notes; as a result, Uematsu struggled with deciding how to work with these, developing new themes for the music in the process despite SaGa 1s director Akitoshi Kawazu's desire to have the music be in the same vein as Square's preceding Final Fantasy titles. Uematsu has stated that the Game Boy was a system he would like to compose for again. SaGa 2 was the first soundtrack or album that Kenji Ito worked on.

All Sounds of SaGa

All Sounds of SaGa is a compilation album of the soundtracks for The Final Fantasy Legend, Final Fantasy Legend II, and Final Fantasy Legend III. The first album of the two-disc set is split between 15 tracks from SaGa 1 and 19 tracks from SaGa 2, while the second disc holds 20 SaGa 3 tracks and an arranged medley of SaGa 1 tracks by Uematsu. The album was published on December 21, 1991, by NTT Publishing/Square with a catalog number of N32D-007/8 and re-released on December 15, 2004, by NTT Publishing with a catalog number of NTCP-1004/5. The album has a total length of 1:28:18 and 55 tracks.

The soundtrack was well received by reviewers such as Patrick Gann of RPGFan, who held that it contained some of the "best composition[s]" in any video game soundtrack. He credited the excellence of the soundtrack to the limited audio resources the composers had to work with on the Game Boy, which in his opinion forced them to be more creative in their compositions. He did note, however, that he felt that the extra arranged medley, while good, was not "anything special". Kero Hazel from Square Enix Music Online had similar comments on the album, praising the composition of the album and its ability to "push the Game Boy sound hardware to its limit", and also felt the arranged medley was lacking. Hazel added that in their opinion the sound quality of the recording equipment used was not as high-quality as would be expected.

Track list

SaGa 2 Hihou Densetsu Goddess of Destiny Original Soundtrack

SaGa 2 Hihou Densetsu Goddess of Destiny Original Soundtrack is an album of music from the Nintendo DS remake of SaGa 2, SaGa 2 Hihou Densetsu Goddess of Destiny. The album was released by Square Enix on September 9, 2009, with the catalog number of SQEX-10171. It includes music from the original game remixed for the DS by Kenji Ito as well as eight new tracks composed for the remake by Ito. The new tracks are "Future Quest", "Muse's Paradise", "To the Lands of Another World", "Thrill! Surrounded By Enemies", "The Whereabouts of the Fierce Battles", "The Goddess of Destiny", "Twilight Courtesan Journey", and "Militant Meat". The album contains 27 tracks and has a total duration of 1:02:10.

The album was poorly received by Patrick Gann, who described it as, instead of an homage to the original sounds or a full remake with live instruments, a "half-assed synth upgrade" which left the pieces sounding neither new nor classic, but instead just dated. He concluded that the "compositions are far more interesting in their original Game Boy format than on this new arrangement".

SaGa 3 Jikuu no Hasha Shadow or Light Original Soundtrack

SaGa 3 Jikuu no Hasha Shadow or Light Original Soundtrack is an album of music from the Nintendo DS remake of SaGa 3, SaGa 3 Jikuu no Hasha Shadow or Light. Square Enix released the album on January 12, 2011, with the catalog number of SQEX-10221. It includes music from the original game remixed for the DS by Ryuji Sasai and Kenji Ito, as well as new tracks composed by the two. The album contains 27 tracks and has a total duration of 1:12:03.

The album was well received by Jayson Napolitano of Original Sound Version, who described it as a rock reinterpretation of the originals. He claimed that Ito "does a stellar job throughout", and that Sasai, while not as consistent, also generally does a good job. He felt that there were only a few pieces that did not do a good job presenting their original works.

Romancing SaGa
The Romancing SaGa subseries of games consists of Romancing SaGa, released in 1992 for the Super Famicom, Romancing SaGa 2, released on the Super Famicom in 1993, and Romancing SaGa 3, released on the Super Famicom in 1995. An enhanced remake of the first game was made for the PlayStation 2 in 2005 called Romancing SaGa Minstrel Song; this version was the only Romancing SaGa game to be published in North America. The series has sparked nine albums: a soundtrack album for each of the three games, an album of arrangements of Romancing SaGa 1 music in a French musical style, three albums of orchestral arrangements of music from Romancing SaGa 2, 3, and Minstrel Song, a promotional soundtrack album for Romancing SaGa 3, and a single for "Minuet", the theme song of Minstrel Song. The music for all of the Romancing SaGa series was composed by Kenji Ito, while each arranged album was arranged by a different artist and Minuet was written, composed and sung by Masayoshi Yamazaki. Ito created the music of each soundtrack based on images from the games, though he never played the games themselves.

Romancing SaGa Original Sound Version

Romancing SaGa Original Sound Version is a soundtrack album for Romancing SaGa. It was composed by Kenji Ito, with the exception of one track, "Heartful Tears", which had been composed for SaGa 1 by Nobuo Uematsu and was arranged by Ito. The album covers 38 tracks and has a duration of 1:02:50. It was first published by Square on February 21, 1992, with the catalog number N25D-009, and reprinted by NTT Publishing on November 25, 1995, with the number PSCN-5036 and on October 1, 2004, with the number NTCP-5036. The first 34 tracks come from the game, while the last four tracks are bonus tracks from other games.

The soundtrack was well received by Patrick Gann, who noted Ito's ability to push the audio hardware of the Super Nintendo to its limit, with various sound effects that were beyond what other similar games were using.

La Romance

Romancing SaGa La Romance is an album of music from Romancing SaGa arranged in a French musical style by Masaaki Mizuguchi.  The original tracks were composed by Kenji Ito. The 11-track album has a length of 42:05. It was first released on July 20, 1992, by Square/NTT Publishing with a catalog number of N30D-025. It was reprinted by NTT Publishing on November 25, 1995, and October 1, 2004, with the catalog numbers PSCN-5037 and NTCP-5037.

The album received mixed reviews from critics. Eve C. of RPGFan disliked the album, calling it a "disappointment" and citing that in her opinion it did not sound French, that many of the tracks were "boring", and that the arrangements were "mediocre".  Patrick Gann, however, said that he was impressed with the album, applauding the instrumentation and calling it "quite the CD". Dave of Square Enix Music Online mostly agreed with Gann, calling it "extremely diverse" and full of "inspired arrangements", marred only by a couple of disappointing tracks.

Romancing SaGa 2 Original Sound Version

Romancing SaGa 2 Original Sound Version is a soundtrack album for Romancing SaGa 2. It was composed by Kenji Ito, with the exception of two tracks, "The Legend Begins" and "Heartful Tears", which were composed by Nobuo Uematsu and arranged by Ito. The album covers 35 tracks and has a duration of 1:12:29. It was first published by Square on December 3, 1993, with the catalog number N25D-022, and reprinted by NTT Publishing on November 25, 1995, with the number PSCN-5038 and on October 1, 2004, with the number NTCP-5038. The first 30 tracks come from the game, while the next four tracks are bonus dance music tracks and the final track is a different version of the game's prologue theme.

The soundtrack was warmly received by reviewers such as Patrick Gann, who said that "while no track on here is amazing, [...] they are all at least fairly good". He also enjoyed the "medieval/renaissance" feeling of the tracks, as well as the relative scarcity of "character themes" compared to the soundtracks of Romancing SaGa 1 and 3.

Eternal Romance

Romancing SaGa 2 Eternal Romance is an album of arrangements of music from the Romancing SaGa 2 soundtrack. The album's 10 tracks were arranged by Ryou Fukui, and were originally composed by Kenji Ito. The soundtrack has a length of 58:17 and was published by NTT Publishing three times: on February 21, 1994, with a catalog number of N30D-025, on November 25, 1995, with the number PSCN-5039, and on October 1, 2004, as NTCP-5039.

The album was appreciated by reviewers such as Dave of Square Enix Music Online, who called it "definitely worth listening to" and applauded the wide variety of instruments as well as the "thought" that went into the tracks. Patrick Gann, on the other hand, said that he felt confused while listening to the album, saying that while it was "interesting, even entertaining", he felt that he was "on the outside of an inside joke" and that only fans of Ito's music would appreciate the album.

Romancing SaGa 3 Original Sound Version

Romancing SaGa 3 Original Sound Version is a soundtrack album for Romancing SaGa 3. It was entirely composed by Kenji Ito. The album covers 70 tracks over three discs and has a duration of 2:29:19. It was first published by NTT Publishing on November 25, 1995, with the catalog numbers PSCN-5033~5, and reprinted by NTT Publishing on October 1, 2004, with the numbers NTCP-5033~5.

The album was well received by Patrick Gann, who termed it "above expectations" and "some of Ito's finest work".  He highlighted the third disc and the character themes as the best tracks on the album.

Track list

Windy Tale

Romancing SaGa 3 Windy Tale is an arranged album of music from Romancing SaGa 3. The pieces were arranged by Taro Iwashiro from tracks composed by Kenji Ito. The album's 10 tracks cover a duration of 45:47. It was first published by NTT Publishing on January 25, 1996, with the catalog number PSCN-5043, and reprinted by NTT Publishing on October 1, 2004, with the number NTCP-5043.

The album was well received by critics such as Eric Farand of RPGFan, who appreciated the slower feel of the album which in his opinion allowed it to focus on "delivering beautiful melodies" and made it "a pleasure to listen to". Dave of Square Enix Music Online agreed, saying it took the original soundtrack and "improve[d] an already good album".  In his opinion, each track was "masterfully composed" and the album was "diverse" in genres.

Prologue

Romancing SaGa 3 Prologue is a promotional album of music from Romancing SaGa 3. The tunes were composed by Kenji Ito. The album contains the character themes from the game, and was included in an identically titled book detailing the game's story, characters and artwork. The album's eight tracks cover a duration of 18:40. It was published by NTT Publishing on November 11, 1995, with the catalog number RSS-0001.

Romancing SaGa Minstrel Song Original Soundtrack

Romancing SaGa Minstrel Song Original Soundtrack is an arranged album of music from Romancing SaGa Minstrel Song, the 2005 enhanced remake of Romancing SaGa. The tracks were primarily composed by Kenji Ito, with one track contributed by Tsuyoshi Sekito and one track contributed by Nobuo Uematsu, and were arranged from those compositions by Ito and Sekito. When Ito arranged the music of Romancing SaGa 1 for Minstrel Song, he felt that because of all of the fans who had played the original game and the change in audio hardware from the Super Famicom to the PlayStation 2 he did not want to simply re-arrange the pieces, but instead tried to "re-make" the soundtrack into something which could stand on its own from the original soundtrack and the game. He spent two years completing the remake. The game's theme song, "Minuet", is sung by Masayoshi Yamazaki. The album's 103 tracks cover a duration of 3:47:32 across four discs. It was published by Universal Music on April 27, 2005, with the catalog numbers UPCH-1411~4.

The album was well received by critics such as Derek Strange of RPGFan, who described it as a "must-have soundtrack" and complimented Ito in both arranging tracks from Romancing SaGa "to both sterling and awesome heights" and in composing new tracks that blended well with the older ones. Chris Greening of Square Enix Music Online agreed, saying that it exceeded expectations and was Ito's "finest work to date". Both reviewers cited the fourth disc as the weakest, with Chris referring to it as "mostly filler tracks".

Track list

Minuet

Romancing SaGa Minstrel Song: Minuet is the single for "Minuet", the theme song of Romancing SaGa Minstrel Song. The song was written, composed, and sung by Masayoshi Yamazaki. The album contains the original song, an acoustic version, and a karaoke version, all performed by Yamazaki. The album's 3 tracks cover a duration of 14:18. It was published by Universal Music on April 13, 2005, with the catalog number UPCH-5303, and also as a limited edition version with the catalog number of UPCH-9176, and included a screensaver and wallpapers for a computer.

Like the soundtrack it was featured on, Minuet was well received by critics.  Patrick Gann called it "strangely beautiful", and described the genre as either "pop or neo-renaissance".  He said that the acoustic version was his favorite version of the song on the album. Totz of Square Enix Music Online called it "a CD with one incredibly wonderful song", but stated that he wished there were more works by Yamazaki on the album than just the one song. He concluded that while the album was definitely "worth it" from a "musical perspective", but might not be from a "buyer's perspective".

SaGa Frontier
The SaGa Frontier subseries consists of SaGa Frontier, a 1997 PlayStation game, and SaGa Frontier 2, released on the PlayStation in 1999. SaGa Frontier was composed by Kenji Ito, the last SaGa game he has worked on besides the remake of Romancing SaGa 1, while SaGa Frontier 2 saw the first work in the series by Masashi Hamauzu. The series has sparked three albums, which are the soundtrack albums to the two games and a collection of piano and orchestral arrangements of music from SaGa Frontier 2. SaGa Frontier 2 was the first soundtrack from the SaGa series that Ito was not a composer for since SaGa 3 nine years prior and the second solo project by Hamauzu after Chocobo no Fushigina Dungeon. Hamauzu has stated that his intention for the soundtrack was to "compose outside the field of conventional 'game music'," and that to do this he "took a lot of chances in every possible way". In the liner notes for the soundtrack album, Hamauzu explained that when he began the project he felt pressured to compose music in the same vein as the previous soundtracks in the series, but in the final months before finishing he decided to abandon any preconceived notions of what the music should sound like and instead to "express [his] own unique character".

SaGa Frontier Original Soundtrack

SaGa Frontier Original Soundtrack is an album of music from SaGa Frontier, composed by Kenji Ito. The album's 75 tracks cover a duration of 3:33:41 across three discs. The third disc contains a hidden track, track 0, which can be found be rewinding the album back from track 1. The album was published by DigiCube on July 21, 1997, with the catalog number SSCX-10009, and re-released by Square Enix on February 1, 2006, with the catalog numbers SQEX-10058~60.

The album reached #69 on the Japan Oricon charts. It was well received by critics such as RPGFan, which said that almost every track was "excellent" and complimented Ito on combining melodies and styles from his Romancing SaGa soundtracks with new styles to form a unique Frontier sound. Ashley Winchester of Square Enix Music Online was more hesitant, saying that while the score had a "lighthearted and easy listening quality" that made it "easy to digest", it was also lacking any "real innovation" and its arrangements were "somewhat simpler" than expected.

Track list

SaGa Frontier II Original Soundtrack

SaGa Frontier II Original Soundtrack is an album of music from SaGa Frontier. The tracks were composed by Masashi Hamauzu. The album's 76 tracks cover a duration of 3:05:14 across three discs. The album was published by DigiCube on April 21, 1999, with the catalog number SSCX-10031, and re-released by Square Enix on February 1, 2006, with the catalog numbers SQEX-10061~3.

The album reached #88 on the Japan Oricon charts. It was well received by critics such as Patrick Gann, who described Hamauzu's inaugural work on the series as "different, but also extremely well-done".  He said that the individual tracks were "darn good" and applauded the innovative synthesizer techniques used. Nathan Black of Square Enix Music Online also highly praised the album, calling it "excellent" and saying that it "amazed him".  Terming the soundtrack Hamauzu's "first major work", he ascribed the album's quality to Hamauzu wanting to "take chances" and make a name for himself. He concluded that because of this there was nothing "bland", "boring" or "predictable" about the soundtrack.

Track list

Piano Pieces "SF2" ~ Rhapsody on a Theme of SaGa Frontier 2

Piano Pieces "SF2" ~ Rhapsody on a Theme of SaGa Frontier 2 is an arranged album of music from SaGa Frontier 2. The tracks were composed and arranged by Masashi Hamauzu and performed by Naoko Endo, Daisuke Hara, Mikiko Saiki, Daisuke Karasuda, and Michiko Minakata. The album's 24 tracks are broken up into groupings of tracks with the same name, with each group of tracks performed by a different person or group of people. Every grouping but the last consists of piano arrangements, while the last grouping, "Rhapsody on a Theme of SaGa Frontier 2", is a full orchestral arrangement. The album has a length of 50:44. It was published by DigiCube on July 7, 1999, with the catalog number SSCX-10033. The album included a booklet with the full score to all of the piano arrangements in the album. It was reprinted by Square Enix on July 21, 2010, with the catalog number SQEX-10197. This version of the album included an extra track number 25, a new version of "'β' 1", which extended the length of the album to 52:52.

The album was well received by critics such as Patrick Gann, who called it "amazing" and a "must-have".  He felt that the "Rhapsody on a Theme" tracks were the best on the album. Aevloss of Square Enix Music Online said that each track was "of a consistently high standard" and that the album as a whole was better than the original soundtrack, which he held to be "very impressive".  He singled out the variety of styles used in the album as particularly worthy of praise.

Unlimited Saga
Unlimited Saga is the newest SaGa game, first published on the PlayStation 2 in 2002 and was composed for by Masashi Hamauzu; it has not yet received any sequels. Unlimited Saga has sparked two albums, a soundtrack album and a promotional single. In the liner notes for the soundtrack album, Hamauzu estimated that he had completed the tunes for the soundtrack at a rate of one per day. He also noted that the game was Square Enix's first "all streaming audio RPG", which meant that the composer and synthesizer operator could use live recordings of each instrument in the final composition rather than using approximations created in a synthesizer. Despite this, some tracks, including "Judy's Theme", use only synthesized sounds as the synthesizer demo created prior to recording a live version sounded so real as to not need to be re-recorded. Hamauzu said that the tracks that used live instruments almost exclusively were the ones that were "Latin" in style, such as "Anxiety towards a Wonder" and "Battle Theme IV". Hamauzu also stated that for the soundtrack he reused several older pieces, with the oldest being "Mysterious Plan" which had been composed 10 years prior, though he said that amount of work that needed to be done to update the pieces required more effort than if he had composed a new piece instead.

Unlimited Saga Original Soundtrack

Unlimited Saga Original Soundtrack is an arranged album of music from Unlimited Saga. The tracks were composed by Masashi Hamauzu, with some tracks arranged for orchestral performance by Shiro Hamaguchi. Hamauzu described the major differences between this soundtrack and his previous works as being the result of changes in technology, which allowed him to include a wider variety of musical genres as well as "ample" acoustic instruments. He has said that his favorite tune from the soundtrack is "Soaring Wings", the theme song for the game, particularly given the short amount of time he had to compose the soundtrack. When Hamauzu thought to use a song in the soundtrack, he decided to cast Mio Kashiwabara as the singer, despite having only met her once at the Tokyo University of Art festival two years before and never working with her. Despite her having never sung a non-classical work before, he was very satisfied with how the song came out.  The album's 58 tracks cover a duration of 2:07:03 across two discs. The final four tracks of the album are arrangements of other pieces on the soundtrack. It was published by DigiCube on January 22, 2003, with the catalog numbers SSCX-10078~9.

The album reached #115 on the Japan Oricon charts. It was well received by critics such as Jeff Tittsworth of RPGFan, who applauded its variety, saying that each track had a "distinct feel" even as the album as a whole felt "cohesive". He also noted that each disc had its own feel, with the first disc containing more mellow and emotional pieces, while the second held "harder" rock, techno and jazz pieces, a dichotomy that he felt strengthened the album as a whole. James McCawley of RPGFan agreed; while he preferred the sound of the second disc, he felt that together they created a stronger album which reflected "the split sides of Hamauzu's musical character". Chris Greening of Square Enix Music Online also enjoyed the album, calling it "an accomplished piece of experimentation that is also often satisfying on an emotional and melodic level", though he added a caveat that if the listener did not enjoy electronic music, they would find the album "often wonderful but also hugely inconsistent".

Track list

Unlimited Saga Maxi Single CD

Unlimited Saga Maxi Single CD is a promotional album of music from Unlimited Saga. All three tracks on the album were composed by Masashi Hamauzu, while "Unlimited SaGa Overture" was arranged for orchestra by Shiro Hamaguchi and "Soaring Wings" was sung by Mio Kashiwabara. The album contains a sampling of the tracks from the game. The album's three tracks cover a duration of 9:29. It was published by Square on December 12, 2002, with the catalog number SQCD-30001, and was included with the limited edition version of the game in Japan.

The single was poorly received by Chris Greening of Square Enix Music Online, who said that while it worked well as a promotional album, it did not work as a stand-alone single after the release of the full soundtrack.  He described it as "very limited" and "a pointless and thankfully obsolete album".

Multiple series
Two albums have been or are planned to be produced that cover more than one SaGa series.  The first, SaGa Battle Music Collection, is an album of battle music, while the second, the SaGa Series 20th Anniversary Original Soundtrack -Premium Box- is a box set of every soundtrack album produced to date from the SaGa series as a whole.

SaGa Battle Music Collection

SaGa Battle Music Collection is an album of battle music from across the SaGa series. The pieces were all composed by Kenji Ito; the album does not include any tracks originally composed by other series composers such as Hamauzu or Uematsu. The album's 14 tracks cover a duration of 46:39 and cover battle music from SaGa 2, Romancing SaGa 1, 2, and 3, SaGa Frontier, and Romancing SaGa Minstrel Song. The final two tracks of the album are piano solos by Ito, and are arrangements of themes common to the series as a whole. The album was produced as a promotional album for the release of Romancing SaGa Minstrel Song to be included with pre-orders of the Japanese release of the game, and was published by Square Enix on April 21, 2005, with the catalog number ROMA-0001. The album was well received by Patrick Gann, who said that it included some of Ito's most memorable tracks.  He called it a "great idea" and said that it was "worth hunting down".

SaGa Series 20th Anniversary Original Soundtrack -Premium Box-

The SaGa Series 20th Anniversary Original Soundtrack -Premium Box- is a soundtrack album collection of music from every released SaGa game. The compilation features 515 tracks on 20 CDs with a total length of 19:02:45, and includes a DVD of developer interviews, a stand display showing an illustration painted by Tomomi Kobayashi, and materials to build a display box for the CDs. The set consists of all of the soundtrack albums from the SaGa series, with All Sounds of SaGa broken up into one disc per game, rather than the original two discs. The set was published on August 26, 2009, to coincide with the 20th anniversary of the release of the first SaGa video game with the catalog numbers SQEX-10145~65. Patrick Gann described it as an excellent collection that was worth the purchase for anyone who wanted to own the entire set and did not already have most of the albums, though he noted that as it included multiple composers and styles the compilation box would not be justified for everyone who liked just some of the music of the SaGa series.

Legacy
"Overture" from Romancing SaGa Minstrel Song was performed at the "Press Start -Symphony of Games- 2006" concert in Tokyo on September 22, 2006. Kenji Ito performed "Passionate Rhythm" from Romancing SaGa Minstrel Song at the "Extra: Hyper Game Music Event 2007" concert in Tokyo on July 7, 2007, along with other performers. Music from SaGa Frontier 2 was played at the fifth Symphonic Game Music Concert, held in Leipzig, Germany on August 22, 2007. The FILMharmonic Orchestra and Choir was conducted by Andy Brick and featured Jaromir Klepac as the pianist; they performed "Feldschlacht V", or "Field Battle 1". Selections from Piano Pieces "SF2" ~ Rhapsody on a Theme of SaGa Frontier 2 were played in a concert in Paris of Hamauzu's work on May 22, 2011. An arrangement of "Main Theme" from SaGa I and "Save the World" from SaGa 2 was performed on July 9, 2011, at the Symphonic Odysseys concert, which commemorated the music of Uematsu.

In addition to the albums produced, music from the original soundtracks of the SaGa games has been arranged for the piano and published by DOREMI Music Publishing. Books are available for Romancing SaGa 3, Romancing SaGa Minstrel Song, SaGa Frontier, SaGa Frontier II, and Unlimited SaGa. The compositions from Unlimited SaGa were rewritten by Tadaomi Idogawa as beginning to intermediate level piano solos, though they are meant to sound as much like the originals as possible. The music for the other books was written by Asako Niwa for piano solos of similar difficulty.

See also
Music of the Final Fantasy series

References

External links
SaGa Series 20th Anniversary Original Soundtrack official site 
Kenji Ito's official website 
Kenji Ito's official English website
Masashi Hamauzu's Square Enix Music Japan profile 
Masashi Hamauzu's Square Enix Music North America profile

SaGa
SaGa series
SaGa series